Saroya Tinker (born February 17, 1998) is a Canadian ice hockey defenseman, currently playing for the Toronto Six of the Premier Hockey Federation (PHF).

Playing career
Tinker attended Monsignor Paul Dwyer Catholic High School in Oshawa, Ontario, where she was an eight-sport high school athlete, playing on Dwyer’s ice hockey, badminton, basketball, curling, field lacrosse, soccer, track and field, and ultimate frisbee teams. A skilled athlete in multiple disciplines, she was recognized as the Junior Female Athlete of the Year in 2012–13 and 2013–14, and the Senior Female Athlete of the Year in 2015–16, in addition to being named ice hockey team MVP in 2013–14 and 2014–15, badminton team MVP in 2013–14 and 2014–15, basketball team MVP in 2013–14, and soccer team MVP in 2013–14. She served as captain of the ice hockey team from grades 10 through 12, captained the basketball and ultimate frisbee teams, and was assistant captain for the soccer team.

Tinker’s minor league career was played with the Clarington Flames Midget AA of the Lower Lakes Female Hockey League (LLFHL) during the 2013–14 season and with the Durham West Jr. Lightning of the Provincial Women's Hockey League (PWHL) during the 2014–15 and 2015–16 seasons. She helped the Jr. Lightning advance to the PWHL Final Four Weekend, registering four goals and fourteen assists (18 points) during the regular season, and seven assists in ten playoff games.

Tinker played the entirety of her collegiate eligibility with the Yale Bulldogs of the ECAC Hockey, scoring 32 points in 122 games played. During her time at Yale, she was recognised for her physical, shutdown style of play.

She was drafted fourth overall by the Metropolitan Riveters in the 2020 NWHL Draft. She signed her first professional contract with the Riveters ahead of the 2020–21 NWHL Season.

After announcing she would be leaving the Riveters after one season, Tinker signed with the Toronto Six in June of 2021.

International play
Tinker represented Canada at the 2017 Ball Hockey World Championship in Pardubice, winning gold.

Tinker played with Team Canada at the 2016 IIHF World Women's U18 Championship, winning a silver medal.

Personal life
Tinker’s father, Harvel, is Jamaican and her mother, Mandy, is Canadian-Ukrainian. She grew up in Oshawa, the eastern anchor of the Greater Toronto Area, with her three brothers. She has been outspoken against racism in hockey and has been willing to share her experiences as a multiethnic player in the predominantly white sport by sitting for a number of interviews and penning several essays regarding race and inclusion in hockey culture.

In September 2022, Tinker signed a partnership deal with hockey equipment company Sherwood. It is the first deal of its kind with a player from the PHF.

Career Statistics

Awards and honors
2021 NWHL Denna Laing Award
2021 NWHL Foundation Award (Metropolitan Riveters representative)

References

External links

1998 births
Living people
Black Canadian ice hockey players
Canadian women's ice hockey defencemen
Ice hockey people from Ontario
Metropolitan Riveters players
Sportspeople from Oshawa
Yale Bulldogs women's ice hockey players
Toronto Six players